Kupcheneyevo (Küpsänäy) is a rural locality (a selo) in Sukkulovsky Selsoviet, Yermekeyevsky District, Bashkortostan, Russia. The population was 445 as of 2010. There are 4 streets.

Geography 
Kupcheneyevo is located 14 km north of Yermekeyevo (the district's administrative centre) by road. Novye Sulli is the nearest rural locality.

References 

Rural localities in Yermekeyevsky District